Sydney Percy Smith Andrew  (1926–2011) was an English industrial chemical engineer. His whole career was with Imperial Chemical Industries (ICI), subsequently ICI Agricultural Division, at Billingham, County Durham, England.

References

Further reading 

 Sydney Andrew – Biographical Memoirs of Fellows of the Royal Society

Fellows of the Royal Society
1926 births
2011 deaths
People from West Hartlepool
Alumni of Trinity Hall, Cambridge